Exilles (Occitan: Eissilhas; nonstandard Occitan: Isiya; Piedmontese: Isiles; Latin: Excingomagus or Scingomagus; Italianization under Italian Fascism: Esille) is a municipality in the Metropolitan City of Turin in the Italian region Piedmont, located about  west of Turin, on the border with France.

It is the location of the Exilles Fort, an alpine fortification which guarded the route between the Kingdom of France and the Duchy of Savoy.

Exilles borders the following municipalities: Bardonecchia, Bramans (France), Chiomonte, Giaglione, Oulx, Pragelato, Salbertrand, and Usseaux.

History 
The ancients considered Exilles the first place in Italy coming from Gaul over the Alpine passes. Pliny the Elder also makes Italy extend to the Alps at Scingomagus, and then he gives the breadth of Gallia from Scingomagus to the Pyrenees and Illiberis.

Twin towns — sister cities 
Exilles is twinned with:
  Château-Ville-Vieille, France

References

Sources

External links 
 Official website

Cities and towns in Piedmont